Birodhi is a census town in the Kaliachak II CD block in the Malda Sadar subdivision of Malda district in the state of West Bengal, India.

Geography

Location

Area overview
The area shown in the adjoining map is the physiographic sub-region known as the diara. It "is a relatively well drained flat land formed by the fluvial deposition of newer alluvium." The most note-worthy feature is the Farakka Barrage across the Ganges. The area is a part of the Malda Sadar subdivision, which is an overwhelmingly rural region, but the area shown in the map has pockets of urbanization with 17 census towns, concentrated mostly in the Kaliachak I CD block. The bank of the Ganges between Bhutni and Panchanandapur (both the places are marked on the map), is the area worst hit  by left bank erosion, a major problem in the Malda area. The ruins of Gauda, capital of several empires, is located in this area.

Note: The map alongside presents some of the notable locations in the area. All places marked in the map are linked in the larger full screen map.

Demographics
According to the 2011 Census of India, Birodhi had a total population of 3,838, of which 1,944 (51%) were males and 1,894 (49%) were females. Population in the age range 0–6 years was 660. The total number of literate persons in Birodhi  was 1,667 (52.45% of the population over 6 years).

Infrastructure
The protected water-supply involved hand pump, tube well/ bore well. It had 100 domestic electric connections.

References

Cities and towns in Malda district